Jackson House may refer to:

in Canada
George Jackson House (Toronto), historic house in Toronto, Ontario

in the United States
(by state then city)
Jefferson Franklin Jackson House, Montgomery, Alabama, listed on the National Register of Historic Places (NRHP) in Montgomery County
E.B. Jackson House, Yuma, Arizona, NRHP-listed in Yuma County
Jackson House (Bentonville, Arkansas), NRHP-listed in Benton County
Jackson House (Fayetteville, Arkansas), NRHP-listed in Washington County
Floyd Jackson House, Hardy, Arkansas, NRHP-listed in Sharp County
Jackson–Herget House, Paragould, Arkansas, NRHP-listed in Greene County
George Jackson House (Ridgway, Colorado), NRHP-listed in Ouray County
F.A. Jackson House, Salida, Colorado, NRHP-listed in Chaffee County
Captain William Parker Jackson House, Tampa, Florida, NRHP-listed
Jackson Rooming House, Tampa Florida, NRHP-listed
George W. Jackson House, Baconton, Georgia, NRHP-listed in Mitchell County
John S. Jackson Plantation House and Outbuildings, White Plains, Georgia, NRHP-listed in Hancock County
Jackson–Johns House, Winder, Georgia, NRHP-listed in Barrow County
Orville Jackson House, Eagle, Idaho, NRHP-listed in Ada County
Jackson–Swisher House and Carriage House, Iowa City, Iowa, NRHP-listed in Johnson County
Jackson–McConnell House, Junction City, Kansas, NRHP-listed in Geary County
Eli Jackson House, Eminence, Kentucky, NRHP-listed in Shelby County
Beckley Jackson House, Hanson, Kentucky, NRHP-listed in Hopkins County
Jackson House (DeQuincy, Louisiana), NRHP-listed in Calcasieu Parish
Jackson House (Winnsboro, Louisiana), NRHP-listed in Franklin Parish
Dr. F.W. Jackson House, Jefferson, Maine, NRHP-listed in Lincoln County
Sen. William P. Jackson House, Salisbury, Maryland, NRHP-listed
Thaddeus Jackson House, Brookline, Massachusetts, NRHP-listed
Jackson House (Newton, Massachusetts), NRHP-listed
Samuel Jackson, Jr. House, Newton, Massachusetts, NRHP-listed
Jackson Homestead, Newton, Massachusetts, NRHP-listed
Mitchell Jackson Farmhouse, Lakeland, Minnesota, NRHP-listed in Washington County
Jackson–Niles House, Kosciusko, Mississippi, NRHP-listed in Attala County
Jackson–Browne House, Kosciusko, Mississippi, NRHP-listed in Attala County
Prior Jackson Homeplace, Fayette, Missouri, NRHP-listed in Howard County
Jackson–Einspahr Sod House, Holstein, Nebraska, NRHP-listed
Richard Jackson House, Portsmouth, New Hampshire, NRHP-listed
Joseph Jackson House, Rockaway Borough, New Jersey, NRHP-listed in Morris County
Jackson House (Alamogordo, New Mexico), NRHP-listed
J.B. Jackson House, Santa Fe, New Mexico, NRHP-listed in Santa Fe County
Jackson–Perkins House, Newark, New York, NRHP-listed
Samuel and Elbert Jackson House, Wantagh, New York, NRHP-listed
Jacob Jackson Farm, Hillsborough, North Carolina, NRHP-listed in Orange County
Jesse Jackson House, Kinston, North Carolina, NRHP-listed in Lenoir County
Andrew Jackson House, Akron, Ohio, NRHP-listed in Summit County
C. S. "Sam" Jackson Log House, Oregon City, Oregon, NRHP-listed in Clackamas County
Jackson Mansion and Carriage House, Berwick, Pennsylvania, NRHP-listed
A. J. Jackson House, Stamford, Texas, NRHP-listed in Jones County
Samuel Jackson House, Beaver, Utah, NRHP-listed in Beaver County
Stonewall Jackson House, Lexington, Virginia, NRHP-listed
John R. Jackson House, Chehalis, Washington, NRHP-listed in Lewis County
Jackson House (Hartland, Wisconsin), NRHP-listed in Waukesha County

See also
George Jackson House (disambiguation)